Clockwork Mice is a 1995 British drama film directed by Vadim Jean and starring Ian Hart, Catherine Russell and James Bolam. The film score was composed by David Hughes and John Murphy.

Plot
A teacher manages to bond with a special needs student.

Cast
 Ian Hart ...  Steve
 Catherine Russell ...  Polly
 Rúaidhrí Conroy ...  Conrad
 Art Malik ...  Laney
 John Alderton ...  Swaney
 James Bolam ...  Wackey
 Claire Skinner ...  Fairy
 Nigel Planer ...  Parkey
 Lilly Edwards ...  Mrs. Charlton
 Robin Soans ...  Millwright
 Jack McKenzie ...  CID Officer
 Melissa Simmonds ...  CID Officer
 Carl Proctor ...  Country Policeman
 Billy Davey ...  Country Policeman
 Hormoz Verahramian ...  Businessman
 Glen Murphy ...  Mr. Charlton
 Toyosi Ajikawo ...  Tanya
 Lee Barrett ...  Clive Williams
 Leon Black ...  Burrows

Location
It was filmed at Great Stony School, Chipping Ongar, Essex. The school was later refurbished as an arts and residential centre, opened by Prince Edward, Earl of Wessex in November 2011.

References

External links

1995 films
1995 drama films
British drama films
Films directed by Vadim Jean
Films scored by John Murphy (composer)
Films set in schools
Films shot in Essex
1990s English-language films
1990s British films